Christian Strohdiek (born 22 January 1988) is a German professional footballer who plays as a centre-back for SC Paderborn II.

Club career
In May 2022, following relegation from the 3. Liga with  Würzburger Kickers Strohdiek announced his retirement from playing. However, he returned for the 2022–23 season, joining SC Paderborn II in the fifth-tier Oberliga Westfalen.

References

External links
 

Living people
1988 births
Sportspeople from Paderborn
German footballers
Footballers from North Rhine-Westphalia
Association football central defenders
Fortuna Düsseldorf players
SC Paderborn 07 players
Würzburger Kickers players
SC Paderborn 07 II players
Bundesliga players
2. Bundesliga players
3. Liga players
Oberliga (football) players